Kim Jun-ho (born 26 May 1994) is a South Korean right-handed sabre fencer, three-time team Asian champion, three-time team world champion, and 2021 team Olympic champion.

Early life 
Kim had been a football player throughout elementary school and was introduced to fencing in middle school. He enrolled at Dong-Eui University as it was one of the few universities which had a fencing team.

Career 
Kim made the senior national team for the 2014–15 season. He took silver in the 2016 Warsaw competition of the 2015–16 Fencing World Cup, narrowly losing to compatriot Gu Bon-gil, and was also part of the team — along with Gu, Kim Jung-hwan and Oh Sang-uk — which won gold in the men's team sabre at the 2016 Asian Fencing Championships. However, there was no men's team sabre at the 2016 Summer Olympics due to the now-abolished rotation policy and he and Oh were not ranked high enough to qualify for the individual event. Unusual for professional athletes, Kim decided to enlist early rather than apply for a postponement and was assigned to the Korea Armed Forces Athletic Corps. While a member of the Corps, he led the men's sabre team to win the President's National Fencing Championships, the main domestic fencing competition, beating Korea National Sport University.

In 2018 Kim was part of the team which swept gold in the team sabre event at both the World Championships and the Asian Games. He was scheduled to be discharged in October but was granted an early discharge; participating athletes who won gold and had yet to complete their military service were granted exemptions but since Kim had already enlisted, he was discharged earlier than scheduled.

With the retirement of Kim Jung-hwan, Ha Han-sol joined the team and they won gold in the men's team sabre event at the 2019 World Fencing Championships. In the individual event, he made it to the Round of 32 where he was defeated by András Szatmári. He also won bronze at the Cairo Grand Prix, having been defeated by Oh in the quarter-final.

Kim was reunited with his teammates from the 2018 Asian Games and World Championships after Kim Jung-hwan came out of retirement and they qualified for the 2020 Summer Olympics. He was the designated substitute for the team and did not compete in the individual event as Kim Jung-hwan's higher individual FIE ranking meant that the latter entered the individual event instead. Despite the postponement of the Olympics, the quartet successfully defended the men's team sabre gold medal. 

Kim was part of the team which won gold at both the 2022 Asian Championships and World Championships. He had a disappointing run in the individual events, having been knocked before the quarterfinal stages in both competitions as well as the Grand Prix competitions.

Medal Record

Olympic Games

World Championship

Asian Games

Asian Championship

Grand Prix

World Cup

Personal life 
In 2018, Kim married his girlfriend Yoo Jung-hyeon. He appeared on The Return of Superman with their son Eun-woo (born October 2021). In a November 2022 episode of The Return of Superman, the couple announced that they were expecting their second child. 

In August 2021, Kim signed with Haewadal Entertainment.

Filmography

Television series

Television shows

Honours

Other 
 2022 KBS Entertainment Awards (2022) –  Popularity Award (The Return of Superman)

References

External links

1994 births
Living people
South Korean male sabre fencers
Fencers at the 2018 Asian Games
Asian Games gold medalists for South Korea
Asian Games medalists in fencing
Medalists at the 2018 Asian Games
World Fencing Championships medalists
Fencers at the 2020 Summer Olympics
Olympic fencers of South Korea
Medalists at the 2020 Summer Olympics
Olympic medalists in fencing
Olympic gold medalists for South Korea
Universiade gold medalists for South Korea
Universiade medalists in fencing
Medalists at the 2017 Summer Universiade
Dong-Eui University alumni
People from Hwaseong, Gyeonggi
Sportspeople from Gyeonggi Province
21st-century South Korean people